Nguyễn Thị Minh Khai (1 November 1910 in Vinh, Annam – 28 August 1941 in Hóc Môn, Cochinchina) was a Vietnamese revolutionary and a leader of the Indochinese Communist Party during the 1930s.

Early life and education
Nguyễn Thị Minh Khai was born Nguyễn Thị Vịnh on 1 November 1910 in Vinh, Nghệ An province, Vietnam.

Her father, Nguyễn Huy Bình, also known as Hàn Bình, was born in Hanoi. He had learnt French but, due to failing the civil service examinations, chose to work as a railway official in Vinh. Her mother, Đậu Thị Thư, was a petty shopkeeper from Đức Thọ, Hà Tĩnh province.

Her father frequently permitted her to retain the banned documents in an upstairs room at the train station. When Minh Khai grew more engaged in her revolutionary activities, her mother, a petty shopkeeper, supported her financially on her frequent visits to different provinces.

Revolutionary career
In 1927, she co-founded the New Revolutionary Party of Vietnam which was a predecessor of the Communist Party of Vietnam. She was considered as one of the prominent female members of the Indochinese Communist Party (ICP). In April 1930, she was delegated to Hong Kong and became a secretary for Hồ Chí Minh (at the time known as Nguyễn Ái Quốc) in the office of the Orient Bureau of the Comintern. In April 1931, Minh Khai was detained by the British administration in Hong Kong. The British colonial government initially planned to turn her over to the French authorities. However, her Cantonese fluency enabled her to avoid being handed over to the French but instead, she was imprisoned in several Kuomintang jails in China from 1931 to 1934. In 1934, she and Lê Hồng Phong were voted to be attendees in the Seventh Congress of Comintern in Moscow. Later she married Lê.

In 1936, she returned to Vietnam and became the top leader of the communists in Saigon. She was seized by the French colonial government in 1940 and was executed by firing squad the next year. Her husband Lê had been jailed in June 1939, and later died in the tiger cages at Poulo Condore prison in September 1942.

Legacy
Today, Nguyễn Thị Minh Khai is honoured as a revolutionary martyr by the Vietnamese Communist Party, and some roads, schools, and administrative units in Vietnam are named after her. Some of these include the Nguyễn Thị Minh Khai urban ward in Bắc Kạn, and Nguyễn Thị Minh Khai High School.

See also
 Lý Tự Trọng
Nguyễn An Ninh
Nguyễn Thần Hiến

Notes

References

 
  
 
 
 
 
 

1910 births
1941 deaths
Vietnamese nationalists
Vietnamese revolutionaries
Members of the 1st Central Committee of the Indochinese Communist Party
People from Nghệ An province
Communist Party of Vietnam politicians
People executed by Vichy France
Executed Vietnamese people
Executed revolutionaries
Executed communists